Denise Kusala Yondo (born 1958), known professionally as Yondo Sister is a Congolese musician mainly associated with the soukous genre of music and the kwassa kwassa dance. She is often referred to as "the queen of soukous" or "the queen of rumba".

Early life 
She was born in the city of Bukavu, in a musical family, the daughter of a Congolese father and a Belgian-Congolese mother.

Career 
She began her career as a singer in Tabu Ley Rochereau's band L'afrisa International, alongside her sister, Chantal Yondo. She initially planned to become a dancer and credits Rochereau with her switch to a musical career.

Personal Life 
Yondo currently resides in Paris.

Discography 
 FBI (2001)
 Agenda (2002)
 Dernière Minute(1995)
 Deviation (1993)
 Bazo (1991)
 Planete (1999)

 Agenda (2003)

References

1958 births
Living people